The men's ice hockey tournament at the 1984 Winter Olympics in Sarajevo, Yugoslavia, was the 15th Olympic Championship. The Soviet Union won its sixth gold medal. Games were held mostly in the arena portion of the Olympic Hall Zetra, with some played in the arena portion of the Skenderija Olympic Hall.

The IIHF did not run a championship in Olympic years at this time. Nations that did not participate in the Sarejevo Olympics were invited to compete in the Thayer Tutt Trophy.

Medalists

Source:
 Gold – 
 Silver – 
 Bronze –

Qualification
The final standings of the 1983 championships were used to establish qualification.  All pool 'A' teams were included however the German Democratic Republic declined to send a team.  The host Yugoslavians as well as the top pool 'B' teams were added.  A play-off between the fourth placed pool 'B' team and the pool 'C' champion was used to determine the final place at the Olympics.

The Norwegian team proceeded to compete at the Olympics.

First round

Group A
Top two teams (shaded ones) advanced to the medal round.

Group B
Top two teams (shaded ones) advanced to the medal round.

Final round
The top two teams from each group play the top two teams from the other group once. Head to head results from the preliminary round (Soviet Union defeated Sweden 10–1, Czechoslovakia defeated Canada 4–0) were carried over.

Classification round
Those countries that finished 3rd and 4th in their groups then played a further game to define their classification

5th place game

7th place game

Statistics

Average age
Team Italy was the oldest team in the tournament, averaging 27 years and 8 months. Team Canada was the youngest team in the tournament, averaging 21 years and 6 months. Gold medalists team USSR averaged 26 years and 1 months. Tournament average was 24 years and 9 months.

Leading scorers

Final ranking

References

External links
Jeux Olympiques 1984
Sport Statistics – International Competitions Archive

 
1984 Winter Olympics events
1984
Olympics, Winter
1984
Ice hockey in Bosnia and Herzegovina